Raymond Charles Gillin (born 1951) is an American Anglican bishop currently serving as bishop ordinary of the Reformed Episcopal Church's Diocese of the Northeast and Mid-Atlantic (NEMA).

Biography
Gillin was born in Philadelphia and raised in Delaware County, Pennsylvania. He graduated from Susquehanna University and received an M.Div. from Reformed Episcopal Seminary. 

He served for 24 years as rector of Grace Reformed Episcopal Church in Collingdale, Pennsylvania, as well as interim rector of St. Mark’s Reformed Episcopal Church in Rydal, Pennsylvania. Gillin was canon to the ordinary under NEMA bishops Leonard W. Riches and David L. Hicks.

On September 29, 2012, Gillin was consecrated as NEMA's bishop suffragan at the Reformed Episcopal Church of the Atonement in Philadelphia by REC Presiding Bishop Riches. Co-consecrators were Hicks, Royal U. Grote Jr., Daniel Morse and Richard Lipka. In 2019, upon Hicks' retirement, Gillin was elected to succeed him as bishop ordinary. 

In 2022, Gillin announced that he would retire by 2025. The diocese called for the election of a bishop coadjutor, and in November 2022, William A. Jenkins Jr. was elected.

Personal life

Gillin is married to Jan, and they live in Marlton, New Jersey. The Gillins have two adult children and four grandchildren.

References

External links
 NEMA profile

1951 births
Living people
Bishops of the Anglican Church in North America
21st-century Anglican bishops in the United States
Bishops of the Reformed Episcopal Church